St. Mary's Catholic Church is a historic Catholic church at 701 Church in Brenham, Texas.

It was built in 1935 and added to the National Register of Historic Places in 1990.

See also

National Register of Historic Places listings in Washington County, Texas

References

External links

Roman Catholic churches in Texas
Churches on the National Register of Historic Places in Texas
National Register of Historic Places in Washington County, Texas
Renaissance Revival architecture in Texas
Churches in Washington County, Texas
Roman Catholic churches completed in 1935
Buildings and structures in Brenham, Texas
20th-century Roman Catholic church buildings in the United States